Bharatiya Kisan Kamgar Party is an Indian political party formed in 1996 by Ajit Singh. Within months of winning Baghpat Lok Sabha constituency from Congress ticket in 1996 Lok Sabha election, Ajit Singh resigned from Congress to form his new party BKKP, with the help of Mahendra Singh Tikait. He contested Baghpat by-poll election on BKKP ticket and won by a margin of 231,440 votes. In 1999, he relaunched his party with the name of Rashtriya Lok Dal.

Electoral performances

Uttar Pradesh Assembly Elections

References 

Political parties in India
Political parties established in 1996